Lake Pythias is a circular freshwater lake in northern Highlands County, Florida.  It is north of Pioneer Lake and just east of Lake Damon.   Lake Pythias has a surface area of 270.45 acres.

Rivers Greens Golf Course is just beyond the west shore of this lake.  However, there is no public access to this lake.

References

Pythias
Pythias